The Deutscher Comedypreis ("German Comedy Award") is awarded by Brainpool TV. Because Brainpool's in-house productions have received extensive awards, the designation as the German Comedy Award is controversial.
The awards ceremony takes place annually in Cologne.

Award winners  
A list of all nominees and award winners since the beginning of the ceremony in 1997:

German Comedy Award 1997 
German Comedy Award:
 Renate Berger and Thomas Hermanns (for Quatsch Comedy Club)

German Comedy Award 1998 
Best Comedyact: Oliver Kalkofe (for Kalkofes Mattscheibe)
Best Comedyact - Newcomer: Marcus Jeroch
Best Basis comedy: Titanic

German Comedy Award 1999 
 17 December 1999; presented by Theo West

Best Comedian, male: Michael Mittermeier
Best Comedian, female: Gaby Köster (for Ritas Welt)
Best Television comedy: Lukas
Best Comedy show: Die Wochenshow
Best Moderation: Stefan Raab (for TV total)
Best Music comedy: Ö La Palöma Boys
Best Humorous commercial: DEA-spot „Super Ingo!“
Best Radio comedy: Elmar Brandt and Peter Burtz (for Die Gerd-Show)
Honorary award: Karl Dall

German Comedy Award 2000 
12 December 2000; presented by Theo West and Atze Schröder

Best Comedy act: Atze Schröder (for Alles Atze)
Best Music comedy: Helge Schneider
Best Comedian male/female in a supporting role: Franziska Traub (for Ritas Welt)
Best Television comedy: Ritas Welt
Best Comedy show: Quatsch Comedy Club
Best Newcomer: Alf Poier
Best Humorous commercial: Verona Feldbusch
Special award for unintentional comedy: Tagesschau
Honorary award: Jochen Busse
Best Comedian, male (audience award): Michael Mittermeier
Best Comedian, female (audience award): Anke Engelke (for Anke)
 nominations: Mariele Millowitsch (for Nikola), Gaby Köster (for Ritas Welt)

German Comedy Award 2001 
2.November 2001; presented by Gaby Köster

Best Comedian, male: Michael Bully Herbig (for Bullyparade)
nominations: Kaya Yanar (for Was guckst du?!), Michael Mittermeier
Best Comedian, female: Anke Engelke (for Anke)
 nominations: Cordula Stratmann (for Zimmer frei!), Annette Frier (for Die Wochenshow)
Best Comedy show: Was guckst du?!
 nominations: Freitag Nacht News, TV Total
Best Television comedy: Ritas Welt
 nominations: Alles Atze, Anke
Best Comedy film: Der Schuh des Manitu
Best Humorous commercial: (Audi)-Spot „Der Elvis-Fan“
 nominations: Apollo-Optik, Media Markt
Best Newcomer: Johann König
Honorary award: Rudi Carrell

German Comedy Award 2002 
19 October 2002; presented by Gaby Köster and Atze Schröder

Best Comedy show: Ladykracher
 nominations: Bullyparade, Krüger sieht alles
Best Television comedy: Hausmeister Krause – Ordnung muss sein
 nominations: Die Camper, Mein Leben & Ich
Best Comedian male/female in supporting role: Christoph Maria Herbst (for Ladykracher)
 nominations: Dana Golombek (for Die Camper), Bettina Zimmermann (for )
Best Comedian, male: Markus Maria Profitlich (for Mensch Markus)
 nominations: Bernd Stelter (for Bernds Hexe), Tom Gerhardt (for Hausmeister Krause – Ordnung muss sein)
Best Comedian, female: Anke Engelke (for Ladykracher)
 nominations: Cordula Stratmann (for Annemie Hülchrath - Der Talk), Mariele Millowitsch (for Nikola)
 nominations: Felicitas Woll (for Berlin, Berlin), Elton (for Elton.tv)
Best Live comedy: Michael Mittermeier (for Back to life)
Best Comedy film: Knallharte Jungs
 nominations: , 
Honorary Award: Otto Waalkes

German Comedy Award 2003 
 11. October 2003; presented by Atze Schröder

Best Comedian male/female: Bastian Pastewka (for Ohne Worte)
 nominations: Anke Engelke (for Ladykracher), Kaya Yanar (for Was guckst du?!)
Best Comedy show: Genial daneben – Die Comedy Arena
 nominations: OLM!, TV Total
Best Television comedy: Alles Atze
 nominations: Bewegte Männer, Nikola
Best Actor in a television comedy: Atze Schröder (for Alles Atze)
 nominations: Axel Stein (for Axel!), Willi Thomczyk (for Die Camper)
Best Actress in a television comedy: Gaby Köster (for Ritas Welt)
 nominations: Heike Kloss (for Alles Atze), Julia Stinshoff (for Crazy Race)
Best Sketch show: Ladykracher
 nominations: Alt und durchgeknallt, Ohne Worte
Best Newcomer: Ralf Schmitz (for Die dreisten Drei)
 nominations: Johnny Challah (for Axel!), Mirja Boes (for Die dreisten Drei)
Best Live act: Dieter Nuhr
TV Special award: Anke Engelke
Honorary award: Dieter Hallervorden
Special award for First successful German television comedy-show:

German Comedy Award 2004 
 17 October 2004; presented by Atze Schröder

Best Comedian male/female: Michael Bully Herbig (for (T)Raumschiff Surprise - Periode 1)
 nominations: Atze Schröder, Bastian Pastewka, Hans Werner Olm
Best Comedy show: OLM!
 nominations: Zimmer frei!, Rent a Pocher
Best Television comedy: Familie Heinz Becker
 nominations: Mein Leben & Ich, Was nicht passt, wird passend gemacht
Best Actor in a television comedy: Ingo Naujoks (for Bewegte Männer)
 nominations: Walter Sittler (for Nikola), Ralf Richter (for Was nicht passt, wird passend gemacht)
Best Actress in a television comedy: Wolke Hegenbarth (for Mein Leben & Ich)
 nominations: Janine Kunze (for Hausmeister Krause – Ordnung muss sein), Arzu Bazman (for Schulmädchen)
Best Moderation: Hape Kerkeling (for Die 70er Show)
 nominations: Sonja Zietlow and Dirk Bach (for Ich bin ein Star – Holt mich hier raus!), Oliver Pocher and Kai Pflaume (for Wok-WM)
Best Sketch show: Mensch Markus
 nominations: Die dreisten Drei, Tramitz and Friends
Best Newcomer: Hennes Bender
 nominations: Ingo Oschmann, Mario Barth
Best Live comedy: Michael Mittermeier
Best Comedy film: (T)Raumschiff Surprise - Periode 1
Honorary award: Emil Steinberger
Special award: 7 Tage, 7 Köpfe

German Comedy Award 2005 
 15 October 2005; presented by Atze Schröder

Best Comedy show: Rent a Pocher
nominations: Hape trifft!, Freitag Nacht News, Kalkofes Mattscheibe 
Best Television comedy: Alles Atze
 nominations: Stromberg, Axel! will’s wissen, Mein Leben & Ich
Best Actor/Actress in a television comedy: Christoph Maria Herbst (for Stromberg)
 nominations: Wolke Hegenbarth, Sabine Pfeifer, Rick Kavanian
Best Sketch show: Bully & Rick
 nominations: Ohne Worte, Die dreisten Drei, Tramitz and Friends
Best Comedian, male: Hape Kerkeling
 nominations: Bully Herbig, Ralf Schmitz, Oliver Pocher
Best Comedian, female: Cordula Stratmann
 nominations: Mirja Boes, Hella von Sinnen, Gaby Köster
Best Improvisational comedy, TV: Schillerstraße
 nominations: Frei Schnauze, Dittsche, Genial daneben
Best Comedy film: 7 Zwerge – Männer allein im Wald
Best Newcomer: Kurt Krömer
Best Live comedy: Mario Barth
Honorary award: Helge Schneider

German Comedy Award 2006 
10 October 2006; presented by Atze Schröder

Best Comedy show: Genial daneben – Die Comedy Arena
 nominations: Hape trifft!, Schmitz komm raus!
Best Television comedy: Pastewka
 nominations: Stromberg, Mein Leben & Ich
Best Sketch comedy: Mensch Markus
 nominations: Die dreisten Drei, Sechserpack
Best Comedy film: Ladyland
 nominations: Arme Millionäre, Die ProSieben Märchenstunde
Best Comedian, male: Hape Kerkeling
 nominations: Oliver Pocher, Ralf Schmitz
Best Comedian, female: Hella von Sinnen
 nominations: Cordula Stratmann, Mirja Boes
Best Actor: Christoph Maria Herbst
 nominations: Bastian Pastewka, Sky du Mont
Best Actress: Andrea Sawatzki
 nominations: Anke Engelke, Wolke Hegenbarth
Best Live comedy: Mario Barth
Best Newcomer: Paul Panzer
Best Comedian, international: Borat (alias Sacha Baron Cohen)
Special award: Horst Schlämmer (alias Hape Kerkeling)
Honorary Award: Jürgen von der Lippe

German Comedy Award 2007 
 23 Oktober 2007; presented by Atze Schröder

Best Sketch show: Switch reloaded
nominations: Bully & Rick, Kargar trifft den Nagel
Best Television comedy: Kinder, Kinder
nominations: Türkisch für Anfänger, Pastewka
Beste Comedy show: Frei Schnauze XXL
nominations: Extreme Activity, Paul Panzers 33
Best Actor in a television comedy: Christoph Maria Herbst
nominations: Christian Ulmen, Heinrich Schafmeister
Best Actress in a television comedy: Anke Engelke
nominations: Carolin Kebekus, Josefine Preuß
Best Newcomer: Cindy aus Marzahn
nominations: Der unglaubliche Heinz, Stefan Schramm & Christoph Walther
Best Comedian, male: Hape Kerkeling
nominations: Oliver Pocher, Mario Barth
Best Comedian, female: Gaby Köster
nominations: Mirja Boes, Cordula Stratmann
Best Comedy film: 7 Zwerge - Der Wald ist nicht genug
Best Live comedy: Mario Barth
Honorary award: Loriot

German Comedy Award 2008 
21 October 2008; presented by Dieter Nuhr
Best Television comedy: Doctor's Diary
nominations: Maddin in Love, Herzog, Two Funny
Best Comedy show: Elton vs. Simon - Die Show
nominations: Achtung! Hartwich, Krömer - Die Internationale Show
Best Comedy event: Fröhliche Weihnachten! - mit Wolfgang & Anneliese
nominations: 20 Jahre Mittermeier, Happy Otto - Wir haben Grund zum Feiern
Best Sketch comedy: Switch reloaded
nominations: Wunderbar, Two Funny
Best Actor: Michael Kessler
nominations: Christian Ulmen, Dirk Bach
Best Actress: Nora Tschirner
nominations: Judith Richter, Susan Sideropoulos
Best Newcomer: Olaf Schubert
Best Comedian, male: Michael Mittermeier
nominations: Oliver Pocher, Mario Barth
Best Comedian, female: Mirja Boes
nominations: Anke Engelke, Cindy aus Marzahn
Best German comedy film: Keinohrhasen
Best Live comedy: Mario Barth
Honorary award: Hugo Egon Balder

German Comedy Award 2009 
20 October 2009; presented by Dieter Nuhr

Best Television comedy: Doctor's Diary
nominations: Der kleine Mann, Der Lehrer
Best Comedy show: heute-show
nominations: Cindy aus Marzahn & Die jungen Wilden, TV-Helden
Best Late-Night-Show: Inas Nacht
Krömer - Die Internationale Show, TV total
Best Comedy event: Quatsch Goes Christmas - Die große Comedy Winter Show
nominations: 100 Jahre Heinz Erhardt, World of Comedy
Best Sketch comedy: Ladykracher
nominations: 4 Singles, Switch Reloaded
Best Candid camera show: Comedystreet
nominations: Böse Mädchen, Verstehen Sie Spaß?
Best Stand-up, TV: Schizophren - Ich wollte 'ne Prinzessin sein (Cindy aus Marzahn)
nominations: Safari (Michael Mittermeier), Verschmitzt (Ralf Schmitz)
Best Comedy film: Zwei Weihnachtsmänner
nominations: Ein Mann, ein Fjord!, Schade um das schöne Geld
Best Actor: Max Giermann
nominations: Bastian Pastewka, Hape Kerkeling
Best Actress: Martina Hill
nominations: Anke Engelke, Diana Amft
Best Comedian, male: Dieter Nuhr
nominations: Mario Barth, Ralf Schmitz
Best Comedian, female: Cindy aus Marzahn
nominations: Ina Müller, Mirja Boes
Best German comedy film: Wickie und die starken Männer
Best Live comedy: Mario Barth
Honorary Award: Mike Krüger
Best Newcomer: Bülent Ceylan

German Comedy Award 2010 
 14 October 2010; presented by Dieter Nuhr

Best Television comedy: Danni Lowinski
nominations: Pastewka, Stromberg
Best Comedy show: heute-show
nominations: Cindy aus Marzahn & Die jungen Wilden, Willkommen bei Mario Barth
Best Late-Night-Show: TV total
nominations: Aufgemerkt! Pelzig unterhält sich, Inas Nacht
Best Comedy event: Fröhliche Weihnachten! – mit Wolfgang & Anneliese
nominations: Der große Comedy Adventskalender, Switch Reloaded – Der Jahresrückblick
Best Sketch comedy: Ladykracher
nominations: Dennis und Jesko, Ich bin Boes
Best Stand-up, TV: Johann König live! Total Bock auf Remmi Demmi
nominations: Kaya Yanar – Live und unzensiert, René Marik live! Autschn!
Best Comedy film: Barfuß bis zum Hals
nominations: C.I.S. – Chaoten im Sondereinsatz, 
Best Actor: Christoph Maria Herbst
nominations: Bastian Pastewka, Jan Josef Liefers
Best Actress: Annette Frier
nominations: Anke Engelke, Diana Amft
Best Comedian, male: Dieter Nuhr
nominations: Eckart von Hirschhausen, Matze Knop
Best Comedian, female: Cindy aus Marzahn
nominations: Mirja Boes, Monika Gruber
Best German comedy film: Zweiohrküken
Best Live comedy: Mario Barth 
Honorary award: Herbert Feuerstein
Best Newcomer: Dave Davis

German Comedy Award 2011 
 18 October 2011; presented by Dieter Nuhr

Best Comedian, male: Bülent Ceylan
nominations: Atze Schröder, René Marik
Best Comedian, female: Cindy aus Marzahn
nominations: Carolin Kebekus, Mirja Boes
Best Actor: Bastian Pastewka
nominations: Matthias Matschke, Max Giermann
Best Actress: Martina Hill
nominations: Annette Frier, Anke Engelke
Best Comedy show: heute-show
nominations: Kaya Yanar & Paul Panzer - Stars bei der Arbeit, Die Bülent Ceylan Show
Best Late-Night-Show: Pelzig hält sich
nominations: TV total, Inas Nacht
Best Television comedy: Danni Lowinski
nominations: Pastewka, Doctor's Diary
Best Sketch comedy: Ladykracher
nominations: Switch Reloaded, 4 Singles
Best Comedy event: Hapes zauberhafte Weihnachten
nominations: Fröhlicher Frühling mit Wolfgang & Anneliese, Der Comedy-Olymp
Best Stand-up, TV: Atze Schröder live! Revolution
nominations: Cindy aus Marzahn live! Nicht jeder Prinz kommt uff'm Pferd, Sascha Grammel live! Hetz mich nicht!
Best Comedy film: Kokowääh
Best Comedy film, TV: 
nominations: Kung Fu Mama, 
Best Live comedy: Mario Barth
Honorary award: Hella von Sinnen
Best newcomer: Sascha Grammel

German Comedy Award 2012 
 23 October 2011; presented by Dieter Nuhr

Best Comedian, male: Oliver Welke
nominations: Bülent Ceylan, Kaya Yanar
Best Comedian, female: Cindy aus Marzahn
nominations: Monika Gruber, Mirja Boes
Best Actor: Bjarne Mädel
nominations: Christoph Maria Herbst, Detlev Buck
Best Actress: Martina Hill
nominations: Annette Frier, Anke Engelke
Best Comedy show: heute-show
nominations: Nicht nachmachen!, Die Bülent Ceylan Show
Best Television comedy: Crime Scene Cleaner (Der Tatortreiniger)
nominations: Danni Lowinski, Stromberg
Best Sketch comedy: Knallerfrauen
nominations: Ich bin Boes, Ladykracher
Best Comedy event: Elton vs. Simon - Die Live-Show
nominations: Der Comedy Olymp, Der große Comedy Adventskalender
Best Stand-up, TV: Olaf Schubert live! Meine Kämpfe
nominations: Dr. Eckart von Hirschhausen live! Liebesbeweise, Michael Mittermeier live! Achtung Baby!
Best Comedy film: 
Best Comedy film, TV: Stankowskis Millionen
nominations: Das große Comeback, Männer ticken, Frauen anders
Best Live comedy: Bülent Ceylan
Honorary award: Gaby Köster
Best newcomer: David Werker
Specialprize:  Thomas Hermanns (for 20 Years Quatsch Comedy Club)

German Comedy Award 2013
 15 October 2013; presented by Dieter Nuhr
Best Comedian, male: Olaf Schubert
nominations: Paul Panzer, Mario Barth
Best Comedian, female: Carolin Kebekus
nominations: Monika Gruber, Cindy aus Marzahn
Best Actor: Bastian Pastewka
nominations: Bjarne Mädel, Dietrich Hollinderbäumer
Best Actress: Martina Hill
nominations: Anke Engelke, Annette Frier
Best Comedy show: Circus HalliGalli
nominations: Die Bülent Ceylan Show, heute-show, Krömer – Late Night Show, Paul Panzer – Stars bei der Arbeit
Best Television comedy: Pastewka
nominations: Die LottoKönige, Crime Scene Cleaner (Der Tatortreiniger)
Best Sketch comedy: Ladykracher
nominations: In jeder Beziehung, Knallerfrauen
Best Comedy event: Die Große TV total Prunksitzung
nominations: Der RTL Comedy Grand Prix, Switch reloaded - Wetten dass..? Spezial
Best Stand-up, TV: Kaya live! All inclusive
nominations: Atze live! Schmerzfrei, Paul Panzer live! Hart Backbord - Noch ist die Welt zu retten!
Best hosts: Sonja Zietlow & Daniel Hartwich at Ich bin ein Star - Holt mich hier raus!
nominations:  Oliver Welke & Olaf Schubert at Deutscher Fernsehpreis 2012, Anke Engelke at Unser Song für Malmö
Best Comedy film: Kokowääh 2
Best Live comedy: Mario Barth
Honorary award: Tom Gerhardt
Best newcomer: Luke Mockridge

External links 
 Official website (German)

References 

German television awards
Comedy and humor awards
German comedy